Scott Helman (born October 1, 1995) is a Canadian singer-songwriter from Toronto. He released his debut EP, Augusta in 2014 followed by Spotify Sessions in 2016 and Hang Ups in 2018. His album Hôtel de Ville was released in 2017 on Warner Music Canada.

Early life 
Born and raised in Toronto, Helman graduated in 2013 from Earl Haig Secondary School. He is Jewish. He says his parents were very supportive of his music career. He got a guitar for his 10th birthday, and he says he knew by the time he was 14, he wanted to be a professional musician. At 15 years old, he signed a development deal with Warner Music Canada, where he began writing sessions with writers such as Simon Wilcox and Thomas "Tawgs" Salter.

Career
In 2014, Helman announced the release of the track "Bungalow" as the first single from his debut EP Augusta. He later toured with Tegan and Sara, Shawn Mendes, Walk Off the Earth, and Vance Joy.

Since the May 2017 release of his full-length album Hôtel De Ville, Helman has toured and released the singles “Kinda Complicated,” “Ripple Effect,” and the gold-certified "PDA".

In February 2018, as part of CBC Music's Junos 365 Sessions, Helman performed the Tragically Hip's song "Bobcaygeon" as a tribute to Gord Downie.

In mid-2018, Helman was invited to open for Vance Joy's five Canadian tour dates and his European tour. In advance of the European tour, Helman released "Hang Ups," followed by a remix featuring Spanish singer Blas Cantó.

In 2019, Helman toured the United States, opening for Dean Lewis. 

In 2020, Helman released his album NonSuch Park with new songs to spark this career. He also talks about his grandfather's inspiration on his album.

In 2021, Helman was a panelist for Canada Reads, an annual "battle of the books" competition, defending Two Trees Make a Forest by Jessica J Lee in a series of debates that took place on CBC radio.

Tours 

 U.S Tour - Supporting Walk Off The Earth - 2015
 European Tour - Supporting Walk Off The Earth - 2015
 Canadian Tour - Supporting Matthew Good - 2015
 Canadian Tour - Scott Vs. Ria - 2017
 Canadian Tour - The Hang Ups - 2019
 North American Tour - Supporting Dean Lewis - 2019
 Canadian Tour - CP Train - 2019

Awards and nominations

Discography

Studio albums

EPs

Singles

Other appearances

'The Hotel Sessions' Youtube Series

References

External links
Official website

Canadian male singer-songwriters
Canadian singer-songwriters
1995 births
Jewish Canadian musicians
Musicians from Toronto
Living people
Canadian pop singers
21st-century Canadian male singers